Stephen Symonds is an Australian rules football coach who is the current head coach of the Collingwood Football Club in the AFL Women's competition (AFLW).

Coaching career

Norwood
Symonds was recruited by Norwood in 2016 to establish its inaugural women’s program. He oversaw one of the leading female football programs in South Australia, leading the team to two grand finals and a premiership in 2017. He received South Australia’s Team Coach of the Year award in 2017.

AFL Women's
Symonds was appointed coach by Collingwood in the AFLW in June 2019. Symonds was chosen from a strong field of candidates that was believed to include former Adelaide AFLW coach Bec Goddard and Richmond AFL coach Danny Frawley.

Coaching statistics
Statistics are correct to the end of the 2021 season

|- style="background-color: #EAEAEA"
! scope="row" style="font-weight:normal"|2020
|
| 7 || 4 || 3 || 0 || 57.14% || 4th(conf. B) || 14(7 per conf.)
|- 
! scope="row" style="font-weight:normal"|2021
|
| 11 || 8 || 3 || 0 || 72.73% || 3rd || 14
|- class="sortbottom"
! colspan=2| Career totals
! 18
! 12
! 6
! 0
! 66.67%
! colspan=2|
|}

References 

Living people
AFL Women's coaches
Year of birth missing (living people)